Child of the Night is a novel by Nancy Kilpatrick published by Raven in 1996. The novel was nominated for both the 1996 Bram Stoker Award for Novel and 1997 Aurora.

Plot summary
Child of the Night is a novel in which Carol Robins is an American divorcee seeking escape in Europe from a marriage that ended in betrayal and which could later threaten her life.

Reception
Maryanne Booth reviewed Child of the Night for Arcane magazine, rating it a 6 out of 10 overall. Booth comments that "Best described as an erotic Mills & Boon 'girl meets S&M monster', writhing with emotional and colourful passages. Largely a fun read, though more than a tad morally questionable in places. Intriguing, but not comparable to Anne Rice at her best."

Reviews
Review by Chris Gilmore (1996) in Interzone, #110 August 1996 
Review by David Mathew (1999) in Interzone, #144 June 1999

References

External links 

 Official Website

1996 novels